Călărași is a county (județ) of Romania on the border with Bulgaria, in Muntenia, with the county seat at Călărași.

Demographics 

In 2011, it had a population of 285,050 and a population density of 56.02/km2.

 Romanians – 95%
 Roma and others –  5

List of cities by population 

All the data, except Călărași, is as of 2002.

 Călărași (county's capital and largest city) – 73,823 (as of 2005)
 Oltenița – 27,217
 Modelu (county's largest village) – 9,804
 Budești (with Crivăț village) – 9,709
 Borcea (village) – 9,676
 Dragalina (village) – 8,760
 Chirnogi (village) – 8,131

The other two towns of Călărași county (Lehliu Gară and Fundulea) have a population under 8,000 inhabitants.

Geography
This county has an area of 5,088 km2.

The entire area lies in the southern part of the Bărăgan Plain and is crossed by small rivers with deep valleys. On its southern and eastern sides there is the valley of the Danube which, on the eastern side, splits into a number of branches, forming islands, now drained. On the western side, the rivers Argeș and Dâmbovița form a wide valley before flowing into the Danube.

Neighbours

Constanța County to the East.
Ilfov County and Giurgiu County to the West.
Ialomița County to the North.
Bulgaria to the South – Silistra Province

Economy
Agriculture is the county's main industry, generating about 3% of the entire country's agricultural output.

The county's industries:
 Metallurgy – there is a big metallurgical plant in Călărași, similar to the one in Galați
 Food processing
 Textiles
 Construction materials

Tourism
Tourism in the county is uncommon. There are only 3 hotels in Călărași County. 
The main tourist destinations:
 The town of Călărași;
 The town of Oltenița;
 Fishing on the Danube.

Politics 

The Călărași County Council, elected at the 2020 local elections, consists of 30 counsellors, with the following party composition:

Administrative divisions

Călărași County has 2 municipalities, 3 towns and 50 communes
 Municipalities
 Călărași – county seat; population: 65,181 (as of 2011)
 Oltenița
 Towns
 Budești
 Fundulea
 Lehliu-Gară

 Communes
 Alexandru Odobescu
 Belciugatele
 Borcea
 Căscioarele
 Chirnogi
 Chiselet
 Crivăț
 Ciocănești
 Curcani
 Cuza Vodă
 Dichiseni
 Dor Mărunt
 Dorobanțu
 Dragalina
 Dragoș Vodă
 Frăsinet
 Frumușani
 Fundeni
 Gălbinași
 Grădiștea
 Gurbănești
 Ileana
 Independența
 Jegălia
 Lehliu
 Luica
 Lupșanu
 Mânăstirea
 Mitreni
 Modelu
 Nana
 Nicolae Bălcescu
 Perișoru
 Plătărești
 Radovanu
 Roseți
 Sărulești
 Sohatu
 Spanțov
 Șoldanu
 Ștefan cel Mare
 Ștefan Vodă
 Tămădău Mare
 Ulmeni
 Ulmu
 Unirea
 Valea Argovei
 Vasilați
 Vâlcelele
 Vlad Țepeș

References

External links

 
Counties of Romania
Geography of Wallachia
1981 establishments in Romania
States and territories established in 1981